The 2020–21 Liga Bet season is the 65th season of fourth-tier football in Israel.

Changes from last season

Team changes
 The four division winners, Ihud Bnei Majd al-Krum, Hapoel Bnei Fureidis, Tzeirei Tayibe and F.C. Dimona were promoted to Liga Alef. Hapoel Bu'eine, Maccabi Bnei Reineh and Ironi Kuseife were also promoted to Liga Alef to fill empty vacancies.
 Since the previous season was abandoned due to the COVID-19 pandemic, no team was relegated to Liga Gimel. However Maccabi Bnei Nahf, Maccabi Ahva Yarka and Maccabi Umm al-Fahm folded and didn't register to this season.
 18 teams from Liga Gimel were promoted from Liga Bet to complete a 72 team line-up, 18 teams in each division.

Format change
To accommodate the shortened schedule caused by COVID-19 pandemic, the league was split into two phases. For the first phase each division was split to two sub-divisions with nine teams in each sub-division, to be played as a double round robin tournament (16 matches in total). At the end of the first phase in each division the two top teams from each sub-division qualifying to a promotion group of four teams, again to be played as a double round robin tournament (6 matches in total), with the winning team gaining promotion to Liga Alef and the second-placed team qualifying to the promotion play-offs.
The seven bottom placed teams in each sub-division would continue in their respective sub-division with the points gained during the first phase, playing an additional round robin schedule (six matches in total). The bottom team in each sub-division would be relegated to Liga Gimel and the sixth placed team would compete to the relegation play-offs.

North A Division

Sub-division A

Sub-division B

Promotion group

North B Division

Sub-division A

Sub-division B

Promotion group

South A Division

Sub-division A

Sub-division B

Promotion group

South B Division

Sub-division A

Sub-division B

Promotion group

Promotion play-offs
In the first round of the play-offs the two second-placed teams from the promotion groups (North section and South section) faced each other in a single match on neutral ground. The winner of the match faced the 14th-placed team from Liga Alef in a single match.

North section

First round

Second round

South section

First round

Second round

Relegation play-offs
In each division (North A and B and South A and B) the sixth-placed teams from each sub-division played each other, with the winning team staying in Liga Bet. The losing team from each division faced the Liga Gimel play-off winner in a single match for a place in Liga Alef.

North A

South A

North B

South B

References

4
Liga Bet seasons
Israel Liga Bet